Adoption studies are one of the classic research methods of behavioral genetics and are an effective technique for assessing the interconnections of genetic and environmental variables in the elicitation of human qualities such as intelligence (IQ) and diseases such as alcoholism. They also compare personality traits and mental disorders. Adoption studies are used alongside twin studies to identify the roles of genetic and environmental variables in the development of drinking issues along with many other diseases in children who were adopted. These studies often include identical twins who are adopted into different families, and they have pinpointed that some traits such as schizophrenia, IQ, criminality and alcoholism are linked to genetics. Adoption studies also usually compare the results of adoptees with biological parents who have alcohol issues and who grow up in varied adoptive circumstances to the outcomes of adoptees reared in comparable situations but without such family origins.

History of research 
Thomas J. Bouchard Jr. is a well-known psychologist who studied behavioral genetics and was the director of the Minnesota Center for Twin and Adoption Research at the University of Minnesota. He also worked on the Minnesota Center for Twin and Family Research. This research has included many types of studies including longitudinal studies and case studies. Bouchard worked mostly on the twin study along with David Lykken, Matt McGue, Nancy Segal, and Auke Tellegen. The twin studies was a series of studies done on sets of twins either identical or fraternal who were separated as infants and raised in different households. The goal of this study was to find out how much of a child's personality is based on their genetics compared to the environment they were raised in. This study was the largest of its kind and began in 1979 and was eventually published in 1990.

Testing design
There are two standard ways in which adoption studies are carried out. There is the adoptee's study method and the adoptee's family method. The adoptee's study method investigates similarities between the adoptee and their biological and adoptive parents. Similarity with the biological parent is expected due to heritable genetics, while similarity with the adoptive parent is associated with home-environment; this is called the shared environmental effect. 
The adoptee's family method compares non-biological siblings who are reared in the same household. Similarity to non-biological siblings raised in the same household is attributed to shared environmental effect, as the siblings are biologically unrelated but share the home environment. 
Variation that cannot be accounted for by either genetics or home-environment is typically described as a non-shared environment. 
Adoption studies are meant to evaluate genetic and environmental influences on phenotype.

Examples

Mental disorders
The first adoption study on schizophrenia published in 1966 by Leonard Heston demonstrated that the biological children of parents with schizophrenia were just as likely to develop schizophrenia whether they were reared by their parents or adopted and was essential in establishing schizophrenia as genetic instead of being a result of child rearing methods. This discovery was made through interviews of both adopted children along with their biological mother who contained the schizophrenia gene, and of adopted children along with their mother who did not contain the schizophrenia gene. The experiment was conducted more than once on various families and continued resulting on the schizophrenia child inheriting the gene from his mother. This supports the theory that it does not matter what specific environment a child is raised in; if its biological parent or parents have a mental disorder, such as schizophrenia, the risk for the child having the same disorder will be equal regardless of who the child is raised by. Analogous studies that followed have shown that mental disorders such as alcoholism, antisocial behavior, depression, and schizophrenia have a large genetic component that interacts with environmental risk factors such as family conflict, poor coherence, and deviant communication. Recent studies have shown that childhood disorders are not only influenced by genetics, but they also form in more children that are adopted in comparison with children that are not adopted.  Many researchers of this topic believed the disorder developed over the time the child was adopted. With more research being done, results have shown that some of the adoptees had been already diagnosed with the disorder before they were even adopted. Researchers concluded the disorders are caused by the way a child is raised and also from the genes of their birth parents. The other few may have developed the disorders after being adopted due to curiosity and trouble finding their true identity. Parents that are willing to adopt are always advised to be aware of the phenomenon that a child that is to be adopted may need help on dealing with psychological issues.

Cognitive ability
The most cited adoption projects that sought to estimate the heritability of IQ were those of Texas, 
Colorado 
and Minnesota 
that were started in the 1970s. These studies showed that while adoptive parents IQ does seem to have a correlation with adoptees IQ in early life, when the adoptees reach adolescence the correlation has faded and disappeared. The correlation with the biological parent seemed to explain most of the variation. In 2015 an adoption study that compared Swedish male-male full-sibships in which at least one member was reared by one or more biological parents and the other by adoptive parents was published. Parental education level was rated on a 5-point scale and each additional unit of rearing parental education was associated with 1.71 points higher IQ. The results were replicated with 2 341 male-male half-sibships, controlling for clustering within families, each additional unit of rearing parental education was associated with 1.94 IQ units. Correlation should also be dependent on the schooling factor for the adoptee since home-based schooling and public schooling would each have its own statistics associated with IQ development.

Crime
One of the most influential and widely cited adoption study on criminality was conducted by Sarnoff A. Mednick and Karl O. Christiansen in Denmark. They argued that relevant data demonstrated that criminality has a significant genetic component that interacts with environmental risk factors. Adoption studies that followed have had similar results. Twin, adoption, and family studies have been a common method to test on criminals to determine if there is a correlation. When studying criminals that are adopted children, their biological and adoptive parents are used for the experiment as well. The first study involving adopted children dealt with the genetics of criminal behavior that proved the children that were more likely to become criminals were biologically related to offenders. This study demonstrates that crime is correlated to be a hereditary factor. The study took place in the 1980s in Iowa and used 52 adopted children that were born into female offenders. Results showed seven of the fifty-two children had committed a criminal act and only one of the adoptive parents had been accused of a crime. The relationship between crime and adoption study has shown evidence to property crime and not to a violent crime in adopted vs not adopted individuals and their adoptive parents or biological ones. Other factors such as age and where the child was moved during adoption affect the accuracy in the conclusions. Even though the adoption study dealing with crime is performed all over the world, possible information has been declined, obtained from deficient adoption centers, and not conducted face to face. The study has been proven to be influenced by genetic factors, but statistics are not 100% defined.

Alcoholism 
In the mid-1970s, adoption studies were conducted to investigate the effects on children of having a biological parent with alcoholism. The study found that sons whose biological father has alcoholism are four times more likely to develop alcoholism within their lifetime, but that it has no effect on any other mental disorders. This study, however, was unable to conclude if daughters had the same reaction, as they had similar results as the control group. A more recent study was published in 2009 which compared the parental alcoholism history of children in non-adoptive and adoptive families. This study found that the likelihood of children developing alcoholism later in life was correlated more with genetic rather than environmental factors.

References

Sources
 
 
 
 
 Newman et al. 1937, Twins: A Study of Heredity and Environment
 Shields 1962, Monozygotic Twins: Brought Up Apart And Brought Up Together
 Juel-Nielsen 1980, Individual and Environment: Monozygotic Twins Reared Apart

Adoption research
Behavioural genetics
Genetics studies
Quantitative genetics
Human genetics